Johanna "Hanny" Allston (born 12 February 1986) is an Australian orienteer.

Johanna Allston, or Hanny Allston as many know her, won the 2006 Junior World Orienteering Championships for the long distance event. She won by a near-record margin of 4 minutes and 38 seconds. She is the first Australian woman orienteer ever to win a gold medal at a World Championship level.

When she won her gold medal it was her last year of eligibility to run in the Junior World Championships.

At the 2006 World Orienteering Championships she claimed gold in the Sprint event. This is the best result by an Australian in the history of the event and she became the first person to win both Senior and Junior World Orienteering Championship titles in the same year.

Hanny currently resides in Hobart, Tasmania where she runs a retail outlet in the CBD selling outdoor sports equipment and life coaching services.

In early 2015, she won the Six Foot Track Marathon in a female course record of 3h 34m 50s.

See also
 List of orienteers
 List of orienteering events

References

External links
 

1986 births
Living people
Australian orienteers
Female orienteers
Foot orienteers
World Orienteering Championships medalists
World Games gold medalists
World Games silver medalists
Competitors at the 2009 World Games
World Games medalists in orienteering
21st-century Australian people
Junior World Orienteering Championships medalists